Mutya Buena is an English singer best known as a founding member of Sugababes. After departing the Subababes in 2005, Buena embarked on her solo career, releasing her debut album Real Girl in June 2007. As a solo artist she has released one studio album and twelve singles (including eight as a featured artist) and has collaborated with George Michael, Groove Armada and Amy Winehouse among others. In 2010 Buena also contributed five tracks to the collaborative album Sound of Camden. In July 2012 Buena reunited with the other original members of the Sugababes, Keisha Buchanan and Siobhan Donaghy, under the new name of Mutya Keisha Siobhan (abbreviated to "MKS"). Following the cancellation of their first album in 2013, the group legally regained the "Sugababes" name in 2019 and released their first music together as Sugababes since 2000's One Touch album: the DJ Spoony-produced track "Flowers".

Studio albums

Singles

As lead artist

As featured artist

Music videos

References

Discographies of British artists
Discography